The 1982 Georgia gubernatorial election was held on November 2, 1982. Joe Frank Harris was elected as the 78th Governor of Georgia.

Democratic nomination
With 10 candidates, including Jack Watson and Buck Melton, running, Bo Ginn won the primary with 316,019 votes (35.11%) to 2nd place Joe Frank Harris and his 223,545 votes (24.84%), necessitating a runoff. In the runoff, Harris prevailed with 500,765 votes (54.97%) to Ginn's 410,259 votes (45.03%).

Republican nomination
Robert H. Bell won the primary with 36,347 votes (59.19%) over Benjamin B. Blackburn and his 25,063 votes (40.81%).

General election results
Though the Democrats once again won the election, Bell did win five counties (Cobb, Gwinnett, DeKalb, Fayette, Bulloch) and the GOP gained their most votes in an election since Howard Callaway in 1966.

References

1982
Georgia
Gubernatorial